Ramananda Chatterjee (29 May 1865 – 30 September 1943) was founder, editor, and owner of the Calcutta based magazine, the Modern Review. He has been described as the Father of Indian Journalism.

Early life 
Chatterjee was born in a middle class Bengali Hindu Brahmin family, the third child to Srinath Chattopadhyay and Harasundari Devi in the village of Pathakpara in the district of Bankura. He received his primary education in a Bengali medium school, even though primary education the English medium had become available by then in Bankura. As a child he liked poetry and soon he was drawn to patriotism through the poems of Rangalal Bandyopadhyay. He passed Student-Scholarship Examination in 1875 from Bankura Banga Vidyalaya. He passed the Entrance from Bankura Zilla School in 1883 arrived at Kolkata to pursue higher education. In 1885, he passed the F.A. from  the St. Xavier's College and took admission in the City College. In 1888, he appeared in the B.A. from City College and stood first class first in the University of Calcutta. He won the Ripon Scholarship of rupees fifty per month. Pleased at the success of Chatterjee, Heramba Chandra Maitra offered him the post of assistant editor at the Indian Messenger, the mouthpiece of Sadharan Brahmo Samaj, of which he was the editor at that time. This offer opened up Chatterjee's future career in journalism. In 1890, he completed his Master of Arts degree in English at the University of Calcutta.

Career 

In 1893, he joined the City College as a lecturer. Along with Jagadish Chandra Bose, he founded the children's magazine Mukul with  Sivanath Sastri as the editor. In 1895, he decided to move to Allahabad with a teaching job at the Allahabad Kayastha Pathshala. In 1897, he became the chief editor of Bengali literary magazine Pradip. He, however left Pradip owing to differences in opinion and subsequently launched Prabasi in 1901.

In 1907, Chatterjee launched the English magazine Modern Review and went on to found two others, the third being the Hindi-language Vishal Bharat (magazine).

See also 
Harish Chandra Mukherjee

References 

1865 births
1943 deaths
Bengali writers
Bengali Hindus
20th-century Bengalis
19th-century Bengalis
Brahmos
City College, Kolkata alumni
St. Xavier's College, Kolkata alumni
University of Calcutta alumni
Academic staff of the University of Calcutta
People from Bankura district
Indian writers
Indian male writers
Indian essayists
Indian male essayists
Indian journalists
Indian male journalists
Indian columnists
19th-century Indian writers
20th-century Indian writers
19th-century Indian male writers
20th-century Indian male writers
20th-century Indian essayists
19th-century Indian essayists
19th-century Indian journalists
20th-century Indian journalists
Journalists from West Bengal
Indian editors
Indian magazine editors
Indian lecturers
Indian schoolteachers
Indian magazine founders